The YM2608, a.k.a. OPNA, is a sound chip developed by Yamaha. It is a member of Yamaha's OPN family of FM synthesis chips, and is the successor to the YM2203. It was notably used in NEC's PC-8801/PC-9801 series computers.

The YM2608 comprises of four internal modules:
FM Sound Source, a six-channel FM synthesis sound system, based on the YM2203
SSG Sound Source, a complete internal implementation of the Yamaha YM2149/SSG, a variant of the popular AY-3-8910/PSG for producing three channels of square wave synthesis or noise.
ADPCM Sound Source, a single channel for samples in 4-bit ADPCM format at a sampling rate between 2–55 kHz
Rhythm Sound Source, a six-channel ADPCM system, enabling playback of six percussion "rhythm tones" from a built-in ROM

The chip includes six concurrent FM channels, four operators per channel, with dual interrupt timers and an LFO. It also includes eight possible operator interconnections, or algorithms, for producing different types of instrument sounds. The SSG (or Software-controlled Sound Generator) is Yamaha's YM2149 programmable sound generator. It includes the SSG's three sound channels, noise generator and dual 8-bit GPIO ports. The YM2608 is used with a YM3016 stereo DAC.

The YMF288, a.k.a. OPN3, is a later development of the YM2608, used in later NEC PC-9801 computer sound cards. It removes the YM2608's GPIO ports, CSM (Composite sine mode) mode and the ADPCM Sound Source. It also reduces the wait times on register access, and adds a low-power standby mode. The YMF288 also came in much smaller physical 28-pin SOP and 64-pin QFP packages.

See also 
Yamaha YM2149
Yamaha YM2203
Yamaha YM2610
Yamaha YM2612
Sound chip

References
YM2608 Application Manual (Translated)

YM2608
Video game music technology